İshakçelebi station is a station in İshakçelebi, Turkey. TCDD Taşımacılık operates a daily intercity train, 17th of September Express, from İzmir to Bandırma.

The station was opened in 1890, by the Smyrna Cassaba Railway.

References

External links
Station timetable

Railway stations in Manisa Province
Railway stations opened in 1890
1890 establishments in the Ottoman Empire
Saruhanlı District